USS Itasca II (SP-803) was a United States Navy patrol vessel in commission from 1917 to 1918.

Itasca II was built as a private motorboat of the same name in 1911 by the Hudson Yacht & Boat Building Company at Nyack, New York. On 29 May 1918, the U.S. Navy acquired her under a free lease from her owner, E. B. Hawkins of Duluth, Minnesota, for use as a section patrol boat during World War I. She was commissioned as USS Itasca II (SP-803) on 13 July 1918.

Assigned to the 3rd Naval District and based at New York City, Itasca II served on harbor and section patrol duties for the rest of World War I and into 1919.

Itasca II was decommissioned on 6 February 1919 and returned to Hawkins

Notes

References

SP-803 Itasca II at Department of the Navy Naval History and Heritage Command Online Library of Selected Images: U.S. Navy Ships -- Listed by Hull Number: "SP" #s and "ID" #s -- World War I Era Patrol Vessels and other Acquired Ships and Craft numbered from SP-800 through SP-899
NavSource Online: Section Patrol Craft Photo Archive Itasca II (SP 803)

Patrol vessels of the United States Navy
World War I patrol vessels of the United States
Ships built in Nyack, New York
1911 ships